Pyrrhulina marilynae is a species of fish in the Pyrrhulina genus found in the basins of the Tapajós and Xingu River. They grow no more than a few centimeters.

The fish is named in honor of Marilyn Weitzman (b. 1926) of the Smithsonian Institution, for mentorship to both describers when they began studying the family Lebiasinidae. Marilyn Weitzman is the wife of ichthyologist Stanley Weitzman.

References

External links
 

Fish described in 2013
Fish of Brazil
Lebiasinidae